Nick Hudson (born 1983) is an Australian rower.

Nick Hudson may also refer to:

One of the Green Party of Canada candidates, 2004 Canadian federal election
Nic Hudson, guitarist of the American band Cartel (band)

See also
Nicholas Hudson (disambiguation)